GlassFrog International Aid Organization, referred to simply as "GlassFrog", is a not-for-profit organization based in Toronto, Canada.

History 
GlassFrog was created in December 2010 by Canadian entrepreneur and philanthropist Nicole Verkindt.  Verkindt launched the venture out of frustration after working with NGOs in post-earthquake Haiti.  She describes her experience there as having been slowed by bureaucracy and cronyism.

Mission 
GlassFrog's mission is to promote transparency and accountability for results in the international aid process.  The organization hosts an online forum where "GlassFrog Bloggers" share information, news and critiques on topics related to aid and relief efforts. The forum is also used to source wikisolutions (crowd-sourced solutions) to global issues.  Funds raised by the organization are used to implement the crowd-sourced solutions created by their users.

Affiliations 
GlassFrog works in cooperation with Ultimate Haiti, owned by James Boulos. GlassFrog is also affiliated with Verkindt's manufacturing company, GMA.

References 

Charities based in Canada
Humanitarian aid organizations